Menkebach is a river of North Rhine-Westphalia, Germany. It flows into the Dalke east of Gütersloh. It has a length of 20.1 km.

See also
List of rivers of North Rhine-Westphalia

References

Rivers of North Rhine-Westphalia
Rivers of Germany